Total mixed ration (TMR) is a method of feeding dairy cattle. The purpose of feeding a TMR diet is that each cow can consume the required level of nutrients in each bite.  A cow's ration should include good quality forages, a balance of grains and proteins, vitamins and minerals.

Management 
The number of groups of animals to be part of a TMR diet depend on existing herd size, the layout of barn, and loafing areas. typically a barn will have high, medium and low production lactating cows, far off and close up dry cows, and pre-breeding and post-breeding heifers. These groups are essential as some (such as first lactation cows) don't do well in overcrowded feed areas. When working with two or three groups it is easier as you can feed the low costing forage to the low group and the high quality forage to the higher group in which can obtain or increase the overall health and performance of cows. For dry cows this system can minimize metabolic and nutritional disorders in calving and post-partpartum period. A pre-breeding and post-breeding system is essential for heifers to ensure proper growth and development.  It is important for pre-breeding heifers to have an energy- and protein-dense diet while post-breeding lack the ability to consume high forage diets.

Summary 

Complete rations feature the blended approach; all forages, concentrates, protein supplements, minerals and vitamins are mixed and offered as a single feed.
Complete-ration systems can save labour and reduce overall feeding costs.
It is extremely important to keep the mixture exactly the same day after day and to make big changes gradually.
Early detection of problems with the ration system is possible by observing the bulk tank milk level after each milking.
Forage analysis is necessary and should include dry matter, crude protein, acid detergent fiber, neutral detergent fiber, calcium and phosphorus.
TMR can be used effectively by many dairy farmers, but it is not a substitute for good management. In fact, the intensity of management may be increased. Most of all, management skills and competency of the dairy farmer are critical to make this system work effectively.

References

Intensive farming
Cattle
Dairy farming